A sunbeam, in meteorological optics, is a beam of sunlight that appears to radiate from the Sun's position.

Sunbeam may also refer to:

Entertainment
 Sunbeam (album), a 1978 album by The Emotions
 Sunbeam (band), a German electronic band
 "Sunbeam" (song), a 2020 song by Kian
 Ponygon and Kafk Sunbeam, characters in Zatch Bell!

Biology 
 Xenopeltidae, in Southeast Asia, commonly called the sunbeam snakes
 Curetis, a genus of gossamer-winged butterflies commonly called the sunbeams
 Aglaeactis, a genus of hummingbirds commonly called sunbeams

Business 
 Sunbeam Australia, an Australian appliance/consumer products manufacturer founded in 1902
 Sunbeam Bread, a franchised brand of white bread
 Sunbeam Cycles, British manufacturer of cycles, bicycles and motorcycles
 Sunbeam Motor Car Company, British automobile manufacturer
 Sunbeam Products, an American appliance/consumer products manufacturer founded in 1897
 Sunbeam Television, an American television station owner

Naval and military 
 USS Sunbeam III (SP-251), a US Navy patrol vessel, 1917 to 1919
 Operation Sunbeam, four nuclear tests at Nevada Test Site in 1962

Places 
 Sunbeam, Colorado, an unincorporated community
 Sunbeam, Illinois, an unincorporated community
 Sunbeam, West Virginia, an unincorporated community
 Sunbeam, a neighborhood in Jacksonville, Florida

Transportation 
 Sunbeam Motor Car Company, a British maker of cars
 Chrysler Sunbeam, a 1977 hatchback automobile
 Sunbeam Talbot, a British sporting car manufacturer from 1938
 Sunbeam Cycles, a brand made by John Marston Ltd. of Wolverhampton, UK
 Sunbeam S7 and S8, a brand of motorcycles 
 BSA Sunbeam, a motor scooter
 Sunbeam 1000 hp, holder of the first land speed record of greater than 200 mph
 Sunbeam (locomotive), a member of the Great Western Railway Sun Class of locomotives
 Sunbeam (passenger train), a passenger train operated from 1925 to 1955 between Houston and Dallas
 Sunbeam, a British luxury yacht launched in 1874

Other 
 Yohkoh, sunbeam in Japanese, a solar observing space probe

See also
 
 
 Beam (disambiguation)
 The Sunbeam (disambiguation)